Brigit Forsyth (born 28 July 1940) is a Scottish actress, best known for her roles as Thelma Ferris in the BBC comedy Whatever Happened to the Likely Lads? and Helen Yeldham in the ITV drama Boon. Since December 2013, Forsyth has appeared in the BBC comedy Still Open All Hours.

Early life
After leaving St George's School for Girls in Edinburgh, Forsyth trained as a secretary before enrolling at Royal Academy of Dramatic Art, where she won the Emile Littler Award.

Career
Forsyth's film work includes The Night Digger (1971) as district nurse, the film version of The Likely Lads (1976) as Thelma Ferris, and Crystalstone (1987), as Isabel.

Forsyth played the cello from the age of nine, but abandoned it once she went to drama school. Her ability was employed when, in 2004, she was cast in the lead role in Cello and the Nightingale, a play about internationally known cellist Beatrice Harrison that premiered at York Theatre Royal. She is now also playing cello in an all girl folk band called Becky & The Sharks.

Forsyth's television work includes Whatever Happened to the Likely Lads? as Thelma Chambers (1972–74); The Glamour Girls (1980-82) as Veronica Haslett; Tom, Dick and Harriet (1983) as Harriet Maddison; The Practice as Dr. Judith Vincent (1986); Sharon and Elsie as Elsie Beecroft (1984–85);  Dark Season (1991) as Miss Maitland; and Boon (ITV, 1989) as Helen Yeldham. She has guested on The Bill; Doctor Who; Dr Finlay's Casebook; Wycliffe; Agatha Christie's Poirot; and also appeared in The Sinners; Holly as the title character Holly Elliot; Adam Smith; Bizarre and Rummage; The Master of Ballantrae; Jackanory; Holding The Fort; Waiting; Dangerfield; Running Wild; The Visit; Graham's Gang; I Told You, Didn't I?; Stanley's Vision as Hilda Spencer; My World; Henry; Nice Town (1992) as Rosemary Dobson; Murder Most Horrid (BBC2, 1996, episode: "A Life Or Death Operation") as Mrs. Osman; Spark (1997) as Mrs. Wells; and Playing the Field (BBC1, 1998) as Francine Pratt, and Heartbeat (2007). In March 1998, Forsyth made a  guest appearance in Coronation Street as Ken Barlow's escort agency client, Babs Fanshawe.

In 2002, Forsyth was the subject of This Is Your Life when she was surprised by Michael Aspel at BBC Broadcasting House. Forsyth appeared in the 2013 Christmas special of Still Open All Hours and returned for a full series on 26 December 2014 as Madge, sister of Maggie Ollerenshaw's character Mavis.

In 2013, Forsyth appeared as Mrs. Jennings in Helen Edmundson's BBC Radio 4 adaptation of Jane Austen's Sense and Sensibility. Her stage work includes Calendar Girls in 2008 and Alan Bennett's People in 2013.  She had previously appeared in Bennett's Single Spies in which she played the part of the Queen. In 2015, she appeared in Now This is Not the End at the Arcola Theatre in London.

References

External links
 

1940 births
Living people
People educated at St George's School, Edinburgh
Alumni of RADA
Actresses from Edinburgh
Scottish soap opera actresses
Scottish television actresses